Jamaluddin Abro, ( - ) also known as Jamal Abro (2 May 1924 – 30 June 2004, Larkana, Pakistan) was a Sindhi writer. He was born in Sangi, a small village in Mehar Taluka, then part of Dadu District.

Life
Abro studied in a number of schools in Larkana and Hyderabad. He passed his matriculation from Bombay University in 1941 and later, became a student at the Bahauddin College in Junagadh, Gujarat. In 1944 he went to Bengal and worked as a volunteer at relief camps for famine affected areas. He also worked as an activist with the Khaksar Movement.

He took a degree in law in 1948 from Shahani Law College in Larkana and started working as a lawyer. Abro entered public service in 1952 and was posted as sub-judge in a number of places in Sindh. In the latter part of his career, he served as a judge in the labor court and as secretary to the Provincial Assembly of Sindh. He remained active on the literary front with the Sindhi Adabi Sangat (the organization of Sindhi writers with members all over Sindh).

Work

Abro's first short story was published in the year 1949 and was followed by a some others. Pishu Pasha aroused much debate and discussion, and this was the name given to the collection of nearly a dozen short-stories published in 1959. This nearly brought to a close Jamal Abro's work as a short story writer and was followed by a long gap of silence. An invitation to contribute a story for a university magazine being edited by Shaikh Ayaz, (the leading Sindhi poet who was a close friend) led him to write his first story in fifteen years. This story focused on karokari (the ritual murder of a woman accused of immorality), written as only the author of "Pirani" could have. It was followed by a story, written during the Writers' Conference, Islamabad, in the days of General Zia ul-Haq's Martial Law; it describes the conference as a setting for an encounter with the angel of death.

External links
https://web.archive.org/web/20150801155410/http://jamalabro.com/
Literary event in Abro's honour
Obituary notice
Text of Pirani 
 https://web.archive.org/web/20100608061558/http://www.chowk.com/articles/4147

1924 births
2004 deaths
Pakistani writers
Pakistan Movement
Sindhi people